Thomas Randall Lee is an American chemist, currently the Cullen Distinguished University Chair at the University of Houston.

Education
NIH Postdoctoral Fellow, Caltech, 1991–1993
Ph.D., Harvard University, 1991
B.A., Rice University, (Magna Cum Laude) 1985

References

External links
Google Scholar profile; highest cited paper as of 19 April 2022 has 4298 citations

Year of birth missing (living people)
Living people
University of Houston faculty
21st-century American chemists
Harvard University alumni
Rice University alumni